Heleophrynidae is a family of frogs, commonly known as ghost frogs. They are thought to be the most basal group in the Neobatrachia. The family consists of two genera, Heleophryne and Hadromophryne, with seven species. Ghost frogs live in swift-moving mountain streams in South Africa. The common name of "ghost frogs" may have been coined because of their occurrence in Skeleton Gorge.

Taxonomy 
The ghost frogs were formerly thought to be closely related to the Sooglossidae of the Seychelles (which are now thought to be a sister group to Ranoidea), or to the Australian Myobatrachidae, which are now thought to be a sister group to Hyloidea. In contrast, more recent taxonomic studies place them as being the most basal extant members of the Neobatrachia and having no close relatives, having diverged from the rest of the Neobatrachia during the Early Cretaceous, about 140 million years ago.

Family Heleophrynidae
 Genus Hadromophryne Van Dijk, 2008
 Natal ghost frog, Hadromophryne natalensis Hewitt, 1913
 Genus Heleophryne Sclater, 1898
 Cederberg ghost frog, Heleophryne depressa FitzSimons, 1946
 Hewitt's ghost frog, Heleophryne hewitti Boycott, 1988
 Eastern ghost frog, Heleophryne orientalis FitzSimons, 1946
 Purcell's ghost frog, Heleophryne purcelli Sclater, 1898
 Royal ghost frog, Heleophryne regis Hewitt, 1910
 Rose's ghost frog, Heleophryne rosei Hewitt, 1925

Biology

Ghost frogs have morphological adaptations suited to surviving on the rocks around these streams. They only come out on full moons. They have very large toe discs in comparison to their size, which helps to cling onto rocks. With the help of the labial teeth the tadpoles contain in their mouths, the mouthparts are modified into sucking discs, to allow them to cling to substrates, and remain still while they are feeding.

EDGE endangered species
On January 21, 2008, Evolutionarily Distinct and Globally Endangered (EDGE) identified nature's most "weird, wonderful and endangered species", stating that "the EDGE amphibians are amongst the most remarkable and unusual species on the planet and yet an alarming 85% of the top 100 are receiving little or no conservation attention." Due to the very ancient origins and deep genetic divergence of Heleophrynidae, the Table Mountain ghost frog (Heleophryne rosei) was listed as #11 on the list.

References

 

 
Neobatrachia
Frogs of Africa
Amphibians of South Africa